Hokey Pokey is the second album by the British duo of singer Linda Thompson and singer/songwriter/guitarist Richard Thompson. It was recorded in the autumn of 1974 and released in the year 1975.

Much of the material on the Hokey Pokey album was written sometime before the album was recorded and even predates the Thompsons' conversion to Islam. 

In terms of musical style Thompson's songwriting on this album reflects a number of British styles despite not being in the English folk-rock style of "Bright Lights": Music Hall, English hymns, traditional brass bands, pub sing-alongs and even the double entendres of George Formby are all discernible. In many cases, Thompson juxtaposes an upbeat tune with a bleak lyric.

It was voted number 604 in the third edition of Colin Larkin's All Time Top 1000 Albums (2000).

Track listing
All songs written by Richard Thompson except as noted.

"Hokey Pokey (The Ice Cream Song)"
"I'll Regret It All in the Morning"
"Smiffy's Glass Eye"
"The Egypt Room"
"Never Again"
"Georgie on a Spree"
"Old Man Inside a Young Man"
"The Sun Never Shines on the Poor"
"A Heart Needs a Home"
"Mole in a Hole" (Mike Waterson)

2004 Island CD reissue
"Wishing" (Buddy Holly, Bobby Montgomery)
"I'm Turning Off a Memory" (Merle Haggard)
"A Heart Needs a Home"
"Hokey Pokey (The Ice Cream Song)"
"It'll Be Me" (Jack Clement)
All extra tracks are live and previously unreleased.

Personnel
Richard Thompson - guitar, vocals, mandolin (3,10), hammered dulcimer (4,5), Electric dulcimer (5,9), piano
Linda Thompson - vocals
Timi Donald - drums
Pat Donaldson  - bass guitar
Simon Nicol - guitar, piano, Hammond organ (8), vocals (7)
John Kirkpatrick  - accordion (1,3,4,10)
Ian Whiteman - piano, calliope (9)
Sidonie Goossens - harp (9)
Aly Bain - fiddle (1,3)
The CWS Silver Band (6,10)

References 

Richard Thompson - The Biography by Patrick Humphries. Schirmer Books. 0-02-864752-1
The Great Valerio - A Study of the Songs of Richard Thompson by Dave Smith.

Richard and Linda Thompson albums
1975 albums
Island Records albums